FreedomPay is a company that provides payments platform as a service. It was founded in 2000 and is currently located in Philadelphia, Pennsylvania. In early 2000, FreedomPay launched mobile payment "proof of concepts" with enterprises such as McDonald's, Bank of America and Visa. Later in 2004, FreedomPay delivered a closed loop payment system for stored value and voucher systems to the markets in the food service industry.

In 2007, FreedomPay developed a gateway for credit card processing (FreeWay) that captures detailed transaction data. That data can be mined for real time intelligence from disparate systems allowing merchants insight into their sales.  Using that data FreedomPay launched a cloud-based platform as a service (PaaS) and a first generation incentives platform.

With the launch of the FreedomPay Commerce Platform in 2009, its customers could deliver those incentives in real time to consumers’ mobile phones and enable mobile payments. All of this technology, is based on an open architecture and is protected by high-level security.

In 2013, FreedomPay was selected by Microsoft as its commerce platform partner for the global banking and retail sectors.

In 2014, FreedomPay earned PCI validation for its point-to-point encryption solution (P2PE). FreedomPay was the first fully functional platform solution in North America to achieve PCI validation, including support for NFC and EMV payments.

Products

FreedomPay Commerce Platform
The FreedomPay platform is a commerce solution including mobile payment capabilities, high-level security, incentive technologies, and business intelligence that integrate with live POS systems.

Mobile payments and incentives
The mobile application connects consumers’ smartphones to the FreedomPay commerce platform at physical merchants. In addition to allowing mobile payments through the use of QR codes, the mobile app delivers targeted incentives, replaces loyalty cards and provides access to electronic copies of receipts.

Merchants utilizing the FreedomPay Commerce Platform have the ability to create offers and loyalty programs. These offers can target users based on a number of criteria, including purchase history as well as user-input information. Users within the merchant-chosen distance can see active incentives within the mobile application, and apply them to their bill at checkout.

The FreedomPay platform allows users to automatically accrue loyalty points. Loyalty rewards are also more flexible. For example, a user could redeem points for a discounted meal, or accrue more points and redeem for a vacation day. Points can also be awarded by financial institutions.

Business Intelligence
FreedomPay Business Intelligence is a piece of the Commerce Platform and provides real-time analysis of business transactions for merchants utilizing the FreedomPay Commerce Platform. Merchants are able to view detailed business reports online and in real time, allowing perspective on their retail practices and effectiveness of individual incentives and programs.

Stored Value
FreedomPay Stored Value is a cashless payment solution, providing corporate clients such as universities, hospitals, and corporate cafeterias with an option for stored value spending. According to the US Treasury, a Stored Value proponent, the benefits of a program like this are the speed provided, flexibility in funding, POS integration, and data collection.

FreedomPay Stored Value cards allow contactless payments and mobile payments at payment terminals.

Funding options include automated funding through bank accounts, credit/debit cards, and payroll deduction, and manual funding using those as well as cash and check. Integration with most major POS systems keeps FreedomPay Stored Value system adoption costs at a minimum.

The online portal for Stored Value allows FreedomPay clients to use that information for a number of purposes, from distributing basic monetary-value vouchers to rewards based on eating habits.

Partnerships

FreedomPay maintains partnerships with enterprises including:

 Microsoft
 MICROS
 Ingenico 
 PTC
 ScanSource
 Digital Dining
 First Data
 HID
 Guckenheimer
 Compass Group
 Sodexo
 Global Payments 
 NCR 
 Aramark
 Compass Group

References

Payment service providers
Companies based in Philadelphia
American companies established in 2000
2000 establishments in Pennsylvania